Dedicated to You is the fifth studio album by American singer Frank Sinatra, released in March 1950 as a set of four 78 rpm records (Catalog: C-197), as well as a 10" LP (CL 6096). 
The tracks were arranged and conducted by Axel Stordahl and his orchestra.

Releases

78 rpm set

"The Music Stopped"/”The Moon Was Yellow"
"I Love You"/"Strange Music"
"Where or When"/"None But the Lonely Heart"
"Always"/"Why Was I Born?"

LP

Personnel
Frank Sinatra - Vocals
Axel Stordahl - Arranger, conductor

Frank Sinatra albums
1950 albums
Columbia Records albums
Albums arranged by Axel Stordahl
Albums conducted by Axel Stordahl